Lamarca or LaMarca is a surname. Notable people with the surname include:

Anthony LaMarca, American musician
Carla Lamarca (born 1982), Brazilian musician
Carlos Lamarca (1937–1971), Brazilian communist
Dolors Lamarca (born 1943), Spanish philologist
Guillermo Lamarca (born 1949), Argentine rugby union player and coach
Iñigo Lamarca (born 1959), Spanish lawyer
Roberto Lamarca (1959–2017), Venezuelan actor
Russell LaMarca, American politician
Tania Lamarca (born 1980), Spanish rhythmic gymnast